The Vagabond Cub is a 1929 American silent Western film directed by Louis King and starring Buzz Barton, Frank Rice and Sam Nelson.

Cast
 Buzz Barton as David 'Red' Hepner 
 Frank Rice as Hank Robbins 
 Sam Nelson as Bob McDonald 
 Al Ferguson as James Sykes 
 Bill Patton as Pete Hogan 
 Milburn Morante as Dan Morgan 
 Ione Holmes as June Morgan

References

Bibliography
 Munden, Kenneth White. The American Film Institute Catalog of Motion Pictures Produced in the United States, Part 1. University of California Press, 1997.

External links
 

1929 films
1929 Western (genre) films
American black-and-white films
Films directed by Louis King
Film Booking Offices of America films
Silent American Western (genre) films
1920s English-language films
1920s American films